The Graham County Courthouse is located at 12 North Main Street in Robbinsville, the county seat of Graham County, North Carolina. The current courthouse is a Classical Revival structure designed by Barber and McMurry of Knoxville, Tennessee, and completed in 1942; it is the third courthouse to stand on the property. The building occupies a prominent location in the center of Robbinsville; it is one of three North Carolina courthouses built with funds from the Depression-era Works Progress Administration.

The building was listed on the National Register of Historic Places in 2007.

See also
National Register of Historic Places listings in Graham County, North Carolina

References

Works Progress Administration in North Carolina
County courthouses in North Carolina
Courthouses on the National Register of Historic Places in North Carolina
Neoclassical architecture in North Carolina
Government buildings completed in 1942
Buildings and structures in Graham County, North Carolina
National Register of Historic Places in Graham County, North Carolina
1942 establishments in North Carolina